9 By Design is an American reality television series which premiered on April 13, 2010, on Bravo. Announced in April 2009 and initially titled as Design Sixx, the show features Robert and Cortney Novogratz, a New York-based husband and wife design team. The eight-part series follows the duo working on large-scale design developments.

The first season averaged 475,000 viewers. The show did not return for a second season.

Episodes

References

External links

2010 American television series debuts
2010 American television series endings
2010s American reality television series
Bravo (American TV network) original programming
English-language television shows